Helens Hill is a rural locality in the Shire of Hinchinbrook, Queensland, Australia. In the  Helens Hill had a population of 123 people.

Geography 
Despite the name, Helens Hill is predominantly flat farming land (approx 20 metres above sea level), well-watered by numerous small creeks and is used for growing sugarcane.

The Bruce Highway  passes through the locality from the south-east to the north.

The North Coast railway line passes through the locality from the south-east to the north with Pombel railway station serving the locality. Previously there were two other railway stations on the North Coast line within the locality, but both of these have been abandoned:

 Burgamoo railway station
 Helens Hill railway station

A cane tramway delivers harvested sugarcane to the local sugar mills at Victoria Plantation and Macknade.

History 
Helens Hill State School opened on 17 August 1931. The school closed on 31 December 2016. It was located at 48388 Bruce Highway.

In the  Helens Hill had a population of 123 people.

References

Further reading

External links 

Shire of Hinchinbrook
Localities in Queensland